Anaides is a genus of scavenger scarab beetles in the family Hybosoridae.

Species
 Anaides carioca Ocampo
 Anaides fossulatus Westwood
 Anaides laticollis Harold
 Anaides longeciliatus Balthasar
 Anaides onofrii Ocampo
 Anaides ortii Ocampo
 Anaides parvulus Ocampo
 Anaides planus Ocampo
 Anaides quinckei Ocampo
 Anaides rugosus Robinson
 Anaides simplicicollis Bates
 Anaides vartorellii Ocampo

References

Scarabaeoidea genera